Petra Záplatová (born December 29, 1991) is a Czech basketball player for BG 89 Hurricanes and the Czech national team.

She participated at the EuroBasket Women 2017.

References

1991 births
Living people
Czech expatriate basketball people in Germany
Czech women's basketball players
People from Trutnov
Point guards
Sportspeople from the Hradec Králové Region